Bimala Nepali (Nepali: बिमला नेपाली)  is a Nepali politician and a member of the House of Representatives of the federal parliament of Nepal. She was elected through the proportional representation system from Nepali Congress.

References

Living people
21st-century Nepalese women politicians
21st-century Nepalese politicians
Nepali Congress politicians from Lumbini Province
Nepal MPs 2017–2022
Members of the 1st Nepalese Constituent Assembly
1978 births